Franziska Busch (born 20 October 1985) is a German retired ice hockey forward and former alternate captain of the German national ice hockey team. She currently serves as the head coach of the German women's national under-18 ice hockey team.

International career
Busch was selected to represent Germany at the Winter Olympic Games in 2006 and 2014. At the women's ice hockey tournament in 2006, she did not record a point across five games. At the women's ice hockey tournament in 2014, she led the team in scoring with three goals and five points.

She played in the 2006, 2010 and 2014 Olympic qualification tournaments.

Busch also played with Germany at eight IIHF Women's World Championships. Her first appearance came in 2004.

Career statistics

International career

References

External links
 

 
 

1985 births
Living people
German women's ice hockey forwards
German ice hockey coaches
Ice hockey players at the 2006 Winter Olympics
Ice hockey players at the 2014 Winter Olympics
Olympic ice hockey players of Germany
People from Seesen
Sportspeople from Lower Saxony